Charles A. Randall (born 1871) was an American architect who practiced in Indiana, South Dakota, and Wyoming.

Life and career
Randall was born on July 9, 1871 in Logansport, Indiana, to Charles H. and Augusta J. (Thissel) Randall, both natives of New England. After graduating from the public schools, he attended the University of Illinois at Urbana, where he studied architecture. After leaving the University, he spent three years in an architect's office in Chicago. After a short time spent in Lead, South Dakota, where he was briefly married, he returned in 1893 to Logansport. There, he joined the office of architect James H. Rhodes. In 1899 he and Rhodes established a partnership, Rhodes & Randall.

In 1901 this partnership was dissolved, and Randall relocated to Deadwood, South Dakota, near Lead. There, he joined the office of Otho C. Jewett, who had been practicing there since at least 1898. In April 1902 Jewett died, and Randall took over the practice. His first major project in Deadwood was the Franklin Hotel, plans for which Jewett had just begun at the time of his death. He remained in Deadwood until 1905, when he relocated to Casper, Wyoming. From there, in 1909, he went to Newcastle, same state. In 1911 he briefly returned to South Dakota, settling in Belle Fourche. By 1913 he had settled in Sheridan, Wyoming, where he appears to have remained for the rest of his career.

Legacy
At least three of Randall's buildings have been placed on the National Register of Historic Places, and at least two more contribute to listed historic districts.

Architectural works

References

1871 births
Architects from Indiana
Architects from South Dakota
Architects from Wyoming
People from Logansport, Indiana
People from Deadwood, South Dakota
People from Casper, Wyoming
People from Sheridan, Wyoming
University of Illinois School of Architecture alumni
Year of death missing